is a subway station in Chūō, Tokyo, Japan, operated by the Tokyo subway operator Tokyo Metro. It serves the Ginza commercial district, and is the fourth-busiest Tokyo Metro station after Ikebukuro, Ōtemachi, and Kita-senju.

Lines
Ginza Station is served by the following three Tokyo Metro lines.
Tokyo Metro Ginza Line (G-09)
Tokyo Metro Marunouchi Line (M-16)
Tokyo Metro Hibiya Line (H-09)

Station layout
Each line has an island platform serving two tracks. The Ginza and Marunouchi Line platforms are located separately on the 2nd basement (B2F) level, while the Hibiya Line platforms are located on the 3rd basement (B3F) level.

Platforms

The song "Ginza Kankan Musume" (銀座カンカン娘, Ginza Kankan Musume) by Ryōichi Hattori is used as the departure melody on the Ginza Line platforms in 2012.

The song  by Yujiro Ishihara and Junko Makimura is used as the departure melody on the Hibiya Line platforms in 2016.

History
Ginza Station opened on the Ginza Line on 3 March 1934. The Marunouchi Line began service to Ginza on 15 December 1957, and the Hibiya Line platforms opened on 29 August 1964.

The station facilities were inherited by Tokyo Metro after the privatization of the Teito Rapid Transit Authority (TRTA) in 2004.

Passenger statistics
In fiscal 2019, the station was used by an average of 257,440 passengers daily.

Surrounding area
An underground passage connects with the following stations, allowing transfer on foot. Ginza-itchōme is the official transfer station, the others are not.
 (Tokyo Metro Yūrakuchō Line)
 (Tokyo Metro Hibiya Line, Toei Asakusa Line)
 (Tokyo Metro Hibiya Line, Tokyo Metro Chiyoda Line, Toei Mita Line)
 (Tokyo Metro Yūrakuchō Line, Yamanote Line, Keihin-Tōhoku Line)

References

External links

 Ginza station information (Tokyo Metro) 
 Ginza station information (Tokyo Metro) 

Tokyo Metro Ginza Line
Tokyo Metro Marunouchi Line
Tokyo Metro Hibiya Line
Stations of Tokyo Metro
Railway stations in Tokyo
Railway stations in Japan opened in 1934
Ginza